Dichomeris angulata is a moth of the family Gelechiidae. It was described by Kyu-Tek Park and Ronald W. Hodges in 1995. It is known from Taiwan.

The length of the forewings is 10-10.5 mm. The forewings are pale brownish grey, with scattered dark brown scales in the basal one-third. There is a dark brown costal blotch. The hindwings are pale grey.

References

angulata
Moths described in 1995